Champion is a 2000 Indian Hindi action film directed by Padam Kumar, starring Sunny Deol, Manisha Koirala and Rahul Dev. The rights to this film are owned by Red Chillies Entertainment.

Plot
The film Champion is a tale about a man who has a quest, a dream to be the best of the best. The film centres on four main characters, namely Rajveer Singh (Sunny Deol), a simpleton from a village in Punjab, whose sole dream in life is to become a super-cop and wipe off all crime. After, training, he gets his first posting at Mumbai for a special assignment. Bubbling with enthusiasm, an arrival, he is shocked to find that his job is to protect a nine-year-old boy, Abbas Khan (Abhishek Sharma). A bodyguard, after all the rigorous training to eliminate hardcore criminals! Abbas is the sole heir to millions of riches left to him by his parents, who have expired in a drastic plane crash. The only threat to Abbas's life is Nazir (Rahul Dev), who has a personal vendetta because of which he venomously stalks the innocent child. Abbas's only guardian is Sapna (Manisha Koirala), who is close to Abbas and his family. Sapna, a vivacious lady and a successful model, is the only source of love, affection and fun in Abbas's life. Rajveer and Abbas hate each other from the world go. Rajveer dislikes this naughty spoilt rich brat for being the cause of his shattered dream of becoming a super-cop whereas Abbas hates Rajveer for curtailing his freedom to do things as he pleases. Abbas then calls upon his messiah, Sapna, to take care of this dictator in his life and together they play pranks on Rajveer to get rid of him. From here starts a very interesting love-hate relationship filled with fun and laughter, only to culminate into Rajveer and Sapna falling in love and Abbas and Rajveer developing a relationship of understanding by the end of the day where Rajveer is ready to risk everything to protect Abbas from Nazir, the only danger in Abbas's life. But this time Nazir has made several chilling attempts to eliminate Abbas. Now the only way to get Abbas out of danger is for Rajveer to nab Nazir and he does not just that, with a powerful climax to this saga. Rajveer kills Nazir in a thrilling climax, rescuing Abbas.

The film had a plot inspired by the movie Mercury Rising.

Cast
 Sunny Deol as Inspector Rajveer Singh
 Manisha Koirala as Sapna Khanna
 Rahul Dev as Nazeer Ahmed
 Master Abhishek Sharma as Abbas Ali Khan
 Master Kaivalya Chheda as Abbas's Friend
 Master Jasmeet Jaggi as Abbas's Friend
 Deepak Parashar as Nawab Mansoor Ali Khan
 Padmini Kapila as Mrs. Mansoor Ali Khan
Rakesh Pandey as Mukhtar Ahmed, Nazeer Ahmed's Father
 Vikram Gokhale as Police Commissioner
 Dina Pathak
 Rana Jung Bahadur as Pandey
 Tom Alter as Doctor
 Kashmera Shah in an item number

Awards

 Nominated: Filmfare Award for Best Performance in a Negative Role - Rahul Dev
 Nominated: Screen Award for Best Actor In A Negative Role - Rahul Dev
 Nominated: Screen Award for Most Promising Newcomer - Male - Rahul Dev

Music
Given by Anu Malik with guest compositions by Vishal–Shekhar and Anand Raj Anand.

 "Aisa Champion Kahan" (Music: Vishal–Shekhar): Sunidhi Chauhan, Jaspinder Narula
 "Ek Ladki Jiski Aankhein" (Music: Anu Malik): Udit Narayan, Alka Yagnik 
 "Jatt Lutya Gaya" (Music: Anand Raj Anand): Hema Sardesai
 "Koi Deewane Ko" (Music: Anu Malik): Roop Kumar Rathod, Alka Yagnik
 "Lelo Lelo" (Music: Vishal–Shekhar): Poornima, Udit Narayan
 "Na Baba Na Baba" (Music: Anu Malik): Kavita Krishnamurthy
 "Tu Kya Cheez Hai" (Music: Anu Malik): Abhijeet Bhattacharya, Kavita Krishnamurthy

References

External links

2000 films
2000s Hindi-language films
Hindi-language action films
Films scored by Anu Malik
Films scored by Anand Raj Anand
Films scored by Vishal–Shekhar
Indian action films
2000 action films